The World Figure Skating Championships is an annual senior figure skating event awarding medals in four disciplines: men's and women's singles, pairs and ice dance. The world title is considered the most important competitive achievement in figure skating after the Olympic gold medal and the most prestigious title at ISU Figure Skating Championships.

Men's singles
The men's event was first held in 1896 in Saint Petersburg and is the oldest discipline at the World Championships. Until 1902 men and women were allowed to compete in the same event (open singles). Since 1903 only men can attend the event.

Ulrich Salchow from Sweden has won the most gold medals in the men's singles discipline and also the most medals in total (thirteen). He won ten golds in a row, however, this feat was not achieved at back-to-back events, as he didn't compete at the World Championships 1906 in Munich. The record for most back-to-back titles is held by Austrian Karl Schäfer with seven gold medals. Most silver medals were won by James Grogan from the United States and Brian Orser from Canada (four each). Andor Szende from Hungary, Alexander Fadeev from the Soviet Union and Jan Hoffmann from East Germany share the record for most bronze medals (three each).

Total medal count by nation

 Countries that no longer participate highlighted in italic
 Small medals of the single competition segments are not included in the list.
 At the 1900 and 1901 World Championships only two competitors participated in the men's singles event, no bronze medals were awarded.
 In 1902 female skater Madge Syers from Great Britain won a silver medal in the open singles event, which counts for the men's singles medal table.

Most gold medals by skater

 Number of gold medals highlighted in bold. If the number of gold medals is identical, the silver and bronze medals are used as tie-breakers (in that order). If all numbers are the same, the skaters get the same placement and are sorted by the alphabetic order.
 The table only shows the period from the first to the last won medal, not all participations at the World Championships.

Most total medals by skater

 Total number of medals highlighted in bold. If the total number of medals is identical, the gold, silver and bronze medals are used as tie-breakers (in that order). If all numbers are the same, the skaters get the same placement and are sorted by the alphabetic order.
 The table only shows the period from the first to the last won medal, not all participations at the World Championships.

Women's singles
After the exclusion of female skaters from the open singles event at the World Championships in 1902, the International Skating Union established a separate second-class competition for women called the ISU Championships, which was first held 1906 in Davos. The first combined World Championships for men, women and pairs took place in 1930 in New York City.

Sonja Henie from Norway holds the records in women's singles for the most won medals (eleven) and most golds (ten), which is also the longest winning streak at back-to-back events in this discipline. Six skaters share the record of most won silver medals (three) – Megan Taylor from Great Britain, Regine Heitzer from Austria, Gabriele Seyfert from East Germany, Surya Bonaly from France, Irina Slutskaya from Russia and Michelle Kwan from the United States. Vivi-Anne Hultén from Sweden and Carolina Kostner from Italy hold the record for the most bronze medals (three each).

Total medal count by nation

 Countries that no longer participate highlighted in italic
 Small medals of the single competition segments are not included in the list.
 At the 1908 and 1910 World Championships only two competitors participated in the women's singles event, no bronze medals were awarded.
 At the 1909 World Championships Lily Kronberger from Hungary was the only competitor and winner of the gold medal. No silver or bronze medal was awarded.

Most gold medals by skater

 Number of gold medals highlighted in bold. If the number of gold medals is identical, the silver and bronze medals are used as tie-breakers (in that order). If all numbers are the same, the skaters get the same placement and are sorted by the alphabetic order.
 The table only shows the period from the first to the last won medal, not all participations at the World Championships.

Most total medals by skater

 Total number of medals highlighted in bold. If the total number of medals is identical, the gold, silver and bronze medals are used as tie-breakers (in that order). If all numbers are the same, the skaters get the same placement and are sorted by the alphabetic order.
 The table only shows the period from the first to the last won medal, not all participations at the World Championships.

Pairs
The first separate pairs event was held in 1908 in Saint Petersburg. The first combined World Championships for men, women and pairs took place in 1930 in New York City.

Irina Rodnina and Alexander Zaitsev from the Soviet Union hold the pair record for most won gold medals and the longest winning streak at back-to-back events (six). Rodnina won another four gold medals with her first partner Alexei Ulanov and was undefeated at ten World Championships in a row. The record of most medals in total is shared by two pairs (eight each): Aljona Savchenko and Robin Szolkowy from Germany, and Ludmila Belousova and Oleg Protopopov from the Soviet Union. Savchenko won another three medals with Bruno Massot and holds the record of most medals by a skater in the pairs discipline (eleven). The siblings Ilse and Erik Pausin won the most silver medals (five), representing Austria and Nazi Germany in their last competition in 1939. Lyudmila Smirnova from the Soviet Union won five silvers as well, but with two different partners. Three pairs share the record for the most bronze medals (three each): the siblings Marianna and László Nagy from Hungary, Cynthia and Ronald Kauffman from the United States and the pair Pang Qing and Tong Jian from China. Todd Sand from the United States and Eric Radford from Canada also won three bronze medals, but each of them achieved it with two different partners.

Total medal count by nation

 Countries that no longer participate highlighted in italic
 Small medals of the single competition segments are not included in the list.
 At the 1910 and 1911 World Championships Ludowika Eilers and Walter Jakobsson competed as a pair representing two different countries (Eilers for Germany and Jakobsson for Finland). Their results count individually for each country in the total medal table.
 At the 1911 World Championships Eilers and Jakobsson were the only competitors in the pairs event, no silver or bronze medal was awarded.

Most gold medals by pair

 Only pair results are included in the list. Individual results in case of partner changes are marked with a note or listed separately below the table.
 Number of gold medals highlighted in bold. If the number of gold medals is identical, the silver and bronze medals are used as tie-breakers (in that order). If all numbers are the same, the pairs get the same placement and are sorted by the alphabetic order by female partner's last name.
 The table only shows the period from the first to the last won medal, not all participations at the World Championships.
 If a skater or pair has competed for multiple countries, all these countries are listed in chronological order based by the period of the competing (from first to last).

Most total medals by pair

 Only pair results are included in the list. Individual results in case of partner changes are marked with a note or listed separately below the table.
 Total number of medals highlighted in bold. If the total number of medals is identical, the gold, silver and bronze medals are used as tie-breakers (in that order). If all numbers are the same, the pairs get the same placement and are sorted by the alphabetic order by female partner's last name.
 The table only shows the period from the first to the last won medal, not all participations at the World Championships.
 If a skater or pair has competed for multiple countries, all these countries are listed in chronological order based by the period of the competing (from first to last).

Four more figure skaters won a total of 6 medals in the pairs event, but with different partners:
 Alexei Ulanov from the Soviet Union has won 4 gold and 2 silver medals: four gold medals partnering with Irina Rodnina (1969–1972) and another two silver medals partnering with Lyudmila Smirnova (1973–1974).
 Marika Kilius from West Germany has won 2 gold, 2 silver and 2 bronze medals: silver and a bronze medal with Franz Ningel (1956–1957) and another two gold, a silver and a bronze with Hans-Jürgen Bäumler (1959–1964).
 Ludwig Wrede from Austria has also won 2 gold, 2 silver and 2 bronze medals: two gold and a bronze medal with Herma Szabo (1925–1927) and another two silver and a bronze with Melitta Brunner (1928–1930).
 Lloyd Eisler from Canada has won 1 gold, 3 silver and 2 bronze medals: bronze medal with Katherina Matousek (1985) and another one gold, three silver and a bronze with Isabelle Brasseur (1990–1994).

Ice dance
Ice dance is the youngest of all four disciplines at the World Figure Skating Championships. It was first held in 1952 in Paris.

Lyudmila Pakhomova and Alexandr Gorshkov from the Soviet Union hold the record for most won gold medals (six) and the longest winning streak at back-to-back events with five (they did not compete in 1975). The record of most medals in total is shared by three ice dance duos (eight each): Natalia Bestemianova and Andrei Bukin, Marina Klimova and Sergei Ponomarenko, and Irina Moiseeva and Andrei Minenkov, all competed for the Soviet Union (although Klimova and Ponomarenko represented CIS in their last competition in 1992). Most silvers were won by Klimova and Ponomarenko as well (five), the record for most bronze medals is held by Shae-Lynn Bourne and Victor Kraatz from Canada (four).

Total medal count by nation

 Countries that no longer participate highlighted in italic
 Small medals of the single competition segments are not included in the list.

Most gold medals by ice dance duo

 (A) – Active skater
 Only duos' results are included in the list. Individual results in case of partner changes are listed separately below the table.
 Number of gold medals highlighted in bold. If the number of gold medals is identical, the silver and bronze medals are used as tie-breakers (in that order). If all numbers are the same, the duos get the same placement and are sorted by the alphabetic order by female partner's last name.
 The table only shows the period from the first to the last won medal, not all participations at the World Championships.
 If a skater or duo has competed for multiple countries, all these countries are listed in chronological order based by the period of the competing (from first to last).

One more figure skater has won 4 gold and 1 silver medal in the ice dance event, but with two different partners:
 Courtney Jones from Great Britain has won two gold and one silver medal with his partner June Markham (1956–1958) and another two gold medals partnering with Doreen Denny (1959–1960).

Most total medals by ice dance duo

 (A) – Active skater
 Only duos' results are included in the list. Individual results in case of partner changes are listed separately below the table.
 Total number of medals highlighted in bold. If the total number of medals is identical, the gold, silver and bronze medals are used as tie-breakers (in that order). If all numbers are the same, the duo get the same placement and are sorted by the alphabetic order by female partner's last name.
 The table only shows the period from the first to the last won medal, not all participations at the World Championships.
 If a skater or duo has competed for multiple countries, all these countries are listed in chronological order based by the period of the competing (from first to last).

Three more figure skaters won a total of 5 medals in the ice dance event, but with different partners:
 Courtney Jones from Great Britain has won 4 gold and 1 silver medals: two gold and one silver medal with June Markham (1956–1958) and another two gold medals with Doreen Denny (1959–1960).
 Anjelika Krylova from Russia has won 2 gold, 2 silver and 1 bronze medals: bronze medal with Vladimir Fedorov (1993) and another two gold and two silver medals with Oleg Ovsyannikov (1996–1999).
 William McLachlan from Canada has won 3 silver and 2 bronze medals: two silver and a bronze medal with Geraldine Fenton (1957–1959) and another one silver and a bronze with Virginia Thompson (1960–1962).

Overall
 The table only shows the period of the achievement, not all participations at the World Championships.
 If a skater or team has competed for multiple countries, all these countries are listed in chronological order based by the period of the competing (from first to last).

Total medal count by nation

 Countries that no longer participate highlighted in italic
 Small medals of the single competition segments are not included in the list.

Most gold medals by skater

 Number of gold medals highlighted in bold. If the number of gold medals is identical, the silver and bronze medals are used as tie-breakers (in that order). If all numbers are the same, the skaters get the same placement and are sorted by the alphabetic order.
 The table only shows the period from the first to the last won medal, not all participations at the World Championships.

Most total medals by skater

 Total number of medals highlighted in bold. If the total number of medals is identical, the gold, silver and bronze medals are used as tie-breakers (in that order). If all numbers are the same, the skaters get the same placement and are sorted by the alphabetic order.
 The table only shows the period from the first to the last won medal, not all participations at the World Championships.

See also
 Major achievements in figure skating by nation
 List of Olympic medalists in figure skating
 Four Continents Figure Skating Championships cumulative medal count
 All-time European Figure Skating Championships medal table

Notes

References

External links
 International Skating Union

World Championships
Medalists
Figure skating